The Moon Is Hell! is a collection of science fiction stories by American writer John W. Campbell Jr. It was published in 1950 by Fantasy Press in an edition of 4,206 copies.  The title story deals with a team of scientists stranded on the Moon when their spacecraft crashes, and how they use their combined skills and knowledge to survive until rescue, including building shelter from meteor showers, and creating their own oxygen from Lunar rock. The second story, "The Elder Gods", Campbell rewrote, on a short deadline, from a story by Arthur J. Burks purchased for Unknown but later deemed unsatisfactory.  It originally appeared in that magazine under the pseudonym Don A. Stuart. The title of the eponymous story is generally reported without the exclamation point, although the punctuation is used for the title of most editions of the collection itself.

Reception
Reviewer Groff Conklin noted that while "The Elder Gods" was "actually not among the best of Campbell's work", the title story, original to the collection, was "a brilliantly circumstantial narrative [and] "first-rate stuff". Anthony Boucher and J. Francis McComas praised the title piece as "an extraordinary short novel ... with Defoe's own dry convincing factuality". P. Schuyler Miller received the volume favorably, describing the title piece as "a realistic story of the first men on another world, worked out with an absolute minimum of hokum". Everett F. Bleiler found "The Elder Gods" to be "contrived, derivative, and dull". Lester del Rey, however, found "The Elder Gods" to be "a fine sword-and-sorcery novel, having some of the magic of A. Merritt but a lot more logic in its development". New York Times reviewer Basil Davenport praised both stories, the title piece for its "close attention to scientific accuracy", the second as "pure swashbuckling romance".

Contents
 "The Moon Is Hell"
 "The Elder Gods"

References

Sources

1950 short story collections
Science fiction short story collections
Works originally published in Unknown (magazine)
Short stories set on the Moon
Fantasy Press books